Colors Kannada (previously known as ETV Kannada), is an Indian general entertainment channel, owned by Viacom18 that primarily broadcasts Kannada language entertainment shows. This channel is currently available in India and the United States. On the success of this channel, another channel named Colors Super, which is also a general entertainment channel, was launched on 24 July 2016. In December 2020, Colors Kannada celebrated its 20th anniversary.

History
The channel was originally launched on 10 December 2000 as ETV Kannada and was promoted by Hyderabad's Ramoji Rao. It later became a part of Viacom 18,owned by Network 18, officially re-branding under the Colors franchise on 26 April 2015. Colors Kannada was the first GEC to start an HD channel in Karnataka.

Current broadcasts

Original serials

Reality shows

Dubbed serials

Former broadcasts

Serials

Reality shows

Dubbed Serials

Channels

References

External links

Kannada-language television channels
Television stations in Bangalore
Television channels and stations established in 2000
2000 establishments in India
Viacom 18
ETV Network